Ungamandadige Nisal Kumudusiri Fernando (born 10 March 1970) is a former Sri Lankan cricketer who played two One Day Internationals in 1994.

External links

1970 births
Living people
Sri Lanka One Day International cricketers
Sinhalese Sports Club cricketers
Moratuwa Sports Club cricketers
Wicket-keepers